Haplochromis worthingtoni is a species of cichlid endemic to Lake Kyoga in Uganda.  This species reaches a length of  SL. The specific name honours the explorer E. Barton Worthington (1905–2001) who collected the type of this species with type with Michael Graham.

References

Fish described in 1929
worthingtoni
Endemic freshwater fish of Uganda
Lake fish of Africa
Taxonomy articles created by Polbot